Jennifer James is an English actress. She played the role of Geena Gregory in Coronation Street.

References

External links

Geena Gregory

Year of birth missing (living people)
Living people
English television actresses